Birutė Kalėdienė (née Zalogaitytė, ; born 2 November 1934, Baltrušiai, Marijampolė County) is a retired Lithuanian javelin thrower who won a silver medal for the Soviet Union at the 1958 European Championships. She competed at the 1960 and 1964 Olympics and finished in third and fourth place, respectively.

Life
Kalėdienė was born in Lithuania in 1934. She started training to throw javelin in 1952 and won the Soviet titles in 1958–60. In 1958 she became the first Lithuanian athlete to set a world record (57.49 m) and was selected as the Lithuanian athlete of the year.

Kalėdienė retired in 1966 to work as a coach in Kaunas. She was a board member of Ąžuolyno Kaunas sports club and continued to compete in the masters category. In 2005, she won a world title in the F70 (Masters) category.

In 2006 she made a Javelin throw of 30m 54 cm as a masters woman in her weight category. In 2017 it was the third longest throw of all time.

References

1934 births
Living people
People from Marijampolė County
Lithuanian female javelin throwers
Soviet female javelin throwers
Lithuanian athletics coaches
Female sports coaches
Olympic athletes of the Soviet Union
Olympic bronze medalists for the Soviet Union
Athletes (track and field) at the 1960 Summer Olympics
Athletes (track and field) at the 1964 Summer Olympics
World record setters in athletics (track and field)
European Athletics Championships medalists
Lithuanian Sportsperson of the Year winners
Medalists at the 1960 Summer Olympics
Olympic bronze medalists in athletics (track and field)